Semagystia cossoides is a moth in the family Cossidae. It was described by Ludwig Carl Friedrich Graeser in 1892. It is found in Kyrgyzstan, Tajikistan and Kazakhstan.

References

Cossinae
Moths described in 1892